Corona Creek may refer to:

 Corona Creek, Montana, United States, a tributary of the Little Thompson River (Montana)
 Corona Creek, Saskatchewan, Canada, a tributary of the North Saskatchewan River